The Galilean Satellites is the first studio album by American post-metal band Rosetta, released in 2005 on Translation Loss Records. The album is two discs long and the track lengths on each disc correspond to each other, indicating that the band intended the albums to be played at the same time. Disc one is in a post-metal style while disc two is ambient noise.

Production
Originally, the band intended to record a standard one-disc album and use the ambient pieces as segues; however, the band had enough material and the approval from Translation Loss to record a second disc. This setup was inspired by Neurosis' album Times of Grace.

Scott Hull of Pig Destroyer and Agoraphobic Nosebleed fame was originally hired to master the album; however, the band's dissatisfaction with his work caused him to leave the project; Weed himself did the mastering instead.

Release
The album was first released in 2005 in a limited-edition digipak format, then later in 2006 in a standard jewel case, both on Translation Loss Records. Additionally, an acoustic remix of "Au Pays Natal" was also recorded, but is not included in the album; rather, it was released as a download-only track on the band's website.

A CD-R recording syncing both discs together as intended was released during Rosetta's 2005 tour and was available in extremely limited quantities.

A 5.1 surround sound DVD-R version of the album was also made by the band. The mix featured the first disc in the front speakers and the second disc played at the same time in the rear. The first version, a plain disc, was sold at shows in 2006, while it was re-released for mail distribution in 2006 and 2007. The DVD also included three live videos. These editions were very limited and are no longer available.

The album was finally released on vinyl on July 15, 2009 by E-Vinyl and Radar Swarm Records. Due to its length, the original first and second discs were released in separate, double-disc gatefold packages. Both were limited to 250 copies each of black and blue colored vinyl.

The album's gatefold artwork was designed by Hydra Head Records founder and artist Aaron Turner, after Translation Loss themselves asked Turner to create the art. The band members have stated that they are fans of Turner's work (Isis in particular, to which Rosetta is frequently compared).

Themes
The liner notes contain no lyrics; only the phrase "These songs are about a space man", indicative of the band's fascination with astronomy. The lyrics themselves also seem to be (on one level) about space travel, and make many references to Europa, one of the Galilean moons. The band themselves have stated that the songs tell a story about a man who becomes dissatisfied with the world around him and leaves to find a place of solitude (Europa). However, upon reaching it, he realizes that he left behind things that were meaningful to him.

The track names on disc two all are names of different stars: Deneb, Capella, Beta Aquilae, Ross 128, and Sol (the Latin name for our own sun). The track names on disc one are all French phrases (apart from "Europa", since "Absent" is the same in English and in French).

Track listing

Personnel
 Michael Armine – sound manipulation, vocals
 David Grossman – bass guitar
 Bruce McMurtrie Jr. – drums
 J. Matthew Weed – electric guitar, violin, mastering
 Aaron Turner – artwork

References

2005 debut albums
Rosetta (band) albums
Albums with cover art by Aaron Turner